Lassipa heliodore, the Burmese lascar, is an Indomalayan butterfly of the family Nymphalidae first described by Johan Christian Fabricius in 1787.

Subspecies
L. h. heliodore Assam, Burma, Peninsular Thailand
L. h. dorelia (Butler, 1879) Peninsular Malaya, Sumatra, Borneo, Pulo Laut
L. h. roepkei (Eliot, 1959) Java

References 

Limenitidinae
Butterflies described in 1787